"Feeling Right (Everything Is Nice)" is the debut single by Norwegian DJ and producer Matoma, featuring rapper Wale and Jamaican dancehall artist Popcaan. It was released on October 16, 2015, by Parlophone Records. The song is produced by Matoma and contains choruses, one bridge, and one verse from Popcaan´s Everything Nice. The remaining verses are performed by Wale.

On the release day, Matoma stated on his facebook page: "My inspiration for this single is a mixture between old school rhythms combined with a chill tropical flavor. When I created the track I wanted to bring Jamaican vibes together with rap vibes and ended up doing a collaboration together with Popcaan & Wale."

Charts

References

2015 singles
2015 songs
Matoma songs
Songs written by Wale (rapper)
Songs written by Matoma
Parlophone singles
Tropical house songs
Wale (rapper) songs